Celtis mauritiana is a species of flowering plant native to Sub-Saharan Africa, Madagascar, the Comoro Islands, and Mauritius.

Range and habitat
Celtis mauritiana ranges across much of Sub-Saharan Africa, from Senegal in the west to Ethiopia in the east, and south to Mozambique and Angola. It is also native to Madagascar, the Comoro Islands, and Mauritius in the western Indian Ocean.

References

mauritiana
Afrotropical realm flora
Flora of Madagascar
Flora of the Comoros
Flora of Mauritius